Lake Xochimilco is an ancient endorheic lake, located in the present-day Borough of Xochimilco in southern Mexico City.

The lake is within the Valley of Mexico hydrological basin, in central Mexico.

History

Geologic
Lake Xochimilco is part of a series of historical lakes, which included:
 Lake Texcoco — brackish
 Lake Zumpango
 Lake Xaltocan
 Lake Chalco — fresh water

Lake Xochimilco was originally a part of an even larger Lake Texcoco during the last glacial period. Between 12,000 and 6,000 years ago, the climate in central Mexico warmed and the snowmelt that once fed Lake Texcoco virtually disappeared. This caused the lake to drop hundreds of feet over next several thousand years. By 2,000 years ago Xochimilco became a bay in the southern portion of Texcoco. Then around the 13th or 14th century the Aztecs built large causeways effectively creating a new lake.

Mesoamerican
These lakes were the home of many Mesoamerican cultures, including the Teotihuacanos, the Toltecs, and the Aztecs.

Due to its shallow waters and the freshwater springs that lined the south shore of the lake, Lake Xochimilco was the center of  agriculture in the centuries of the pre-Columbian era.  This made the region a prime target for the expansionist Aztecs, who obtained control over the lake in a series of campaigns, from  until 1440, during the reign of the Aztec , Itzcóatl.

Spanish colonial
After the Spanish conquest of the Aztec empire in 1521, the Spaniards' destruction of the dams and sluice gates in the 1520s, as well as the sharp declines in the native population, led to the near abandonment of the chinampa gardens.

Description 

The five lakes within the Valley of Mexico have now largely disappeared, drained to reduce flooding. Only the Xochimilco canals remain from the original Lake Xochimilco.  work their chinampa gardens between the canals.

Xochimilco Lake remnants are part of large urban parks in Mexico City, with water-based and land recreation. Colourful  (rafts) take groups of people on the remaining canals for pleasure.

Xochimilco Ecological Park and Plant Market was established as a nature reserve and park, and is the largest park in Mexico City after Chapultepec. There is also the  Xochimilco/Cuemanco Plant Market, the largest in Latin America. The market is on chinampa land.

Conservation
The area was declared a biological reserve by the Mexican government in 1984. It became part of a UNESCO World Heritage Site in 1987.

Lake Xochimilco is the last remaining native habitat for the axolotl, a species of mole salamander endemic to Mexico. Until Lake Chalco was drained, the species had also been present there. Given Lake Xochimilco's present extensively compromised and reduced state, and the accelerating impact of Mexico City's urban growth,  axolotl in the wild are listed as a critically endangered species by the IUCN.

See also

 Xochimilco
 Bosque de Nativitas Park, Xochimilco
 Xochimilco Ecological Park and Plant Market

References

External links

  Soy Xochimilco - CONABIO via YouTube

Endorheic lakes of North America
Geography of Mesoamerica
Lakes of Mexico
Landforms of Mexico City
Parks in Mexico City
Valley of Mexico
Xochimilco